Valeriodes is a genus of moths of the family Noctuidae.

Species
 Valeriodes cyanelinea (Hampson, 1894)
 Valeriodes heterocampa (Moore, 1882)
 Valeriodes icamba (Swinhoe, 1893)
 Valeriodes viridinigra (Hampson, 1896)

References
Natural History Museum Lepidoptera genus database
Valeriodes at funet

Cuculliinae